Saint-Denis is a town and comune in the Aosta Valley region of north-western Italy near the ruins of Cly castle.

References

Cities and towns in Aosta Valley